The Misanthrope is a 1974 Australian film adaptation of the play The Misanthrope by Moliere.

References

External links

Australian drama films
Australian films based on plays
Films based on works by Molière
1974 films
Films directed by Carl Schultz
1970s English-language films
1970s Australian films